Warren Chase (January 5, 1813 – February 25, 1891) was an American pioneer, reformer, and politician. He served in the state senates of Wisconsin and California, and was a candidate for Governor of Wisconsin in the election of 1849.

Early life and education
Chase was born in Pittsfield, New Hampshire, on January 5, 1813. He was the son of Susanna Durgin, who was unmarried at the time.  His mother was maligned by the community and expelled from the church for giving birth out of wedlock, making it difficult to provide for herself and Warren.  Warren's father was Simon Chase, who was married to Huldah Peaslee.  Simon Chase fought in the War of 1812 and died at Plattsburgh in the fall of 1814, when Warren was not yet two years old.  His mother died only a few years later, when Warren was five.

As a child, Warren lived briefly with a Quaker family near Catamount Mountain.  But after his mother's death, he became a ward of David Fogg and his family.  Warren later described this time as a miserable experience and compared his servitude to slavery.  Warren did not receive an education with the Fogg family and, at age fourteen was still not able to read or write.  It was at that age he ran away to his grandmother's home in Pittsfield.  Warren's grandmother and other members of the community interceded on his behalf and he was transferred to the care of his paternal grandfather, Nathaniel Chase, where he received a proper education and upbringing.

In 1834 he moved to Monroe, in the Michigan Territory, and then, in 1838, he moved to the Wisconsin Territory, settling in Kenosha (then known as "Southport").

In Wisconsin 
In the fall of 1843 the Franklin Lyceum of Southport began discussing the ideas of the French philosopher Charles Fourier and his American popularizer Albert Brisbane. Convinced of the applicability of Fourier's "Associationist" prescription, Chase committed himself to the emerging movement without reservation, organizing a series of preliminary meetings to draft a constitution for a local "phalanx."

On March 23, 1844, a formal meeting of phalanx supporters was held at the Southport village schoolhouse, officers were elected, and a group of three, including Warren Chase, were tapped as trustees of the phalanx.  A bond sale of $10,000 was approved and stock in the new enterprise began to be sold. On May 8, 1844, they decided to purchase 1.25 sections (800 acres) of government land, located in a valley between two gentle hills. By that fall a total of 1.5 sections (960 acres) were purchasedwhich would become Ceresco, Wisconsin (later merged into Ripon.

Chase helped found Ripon College. Chase was a supporter of the temperance, abolitionist, and spiritualist movements and wrote books and articles.

Chase served in the two Wisconsin Constitutional Conventions of 1846 and 1847 and was elected to the first Wisconsin Senate from 4th Senate district as a Democrat.  In 1849, he was the candidate of the newly organized Free Soil Party for Governor of Wisconsin, coming in third behind Democratic incumbent Nelson Dewey and Whig Alexander L. Collins.

After Wisconsin 
After the dissolution of the Wisconsin Phalanx, he moved to Michigan in 1853, then to Missouri, where he was elected as a Presidential elector in the 1872 United States presidential election.  In 1876 he moved to California and settled in Santa Barbara, where he worked as editor of the Independent newspaper. While in California he was elected to the California State Senate on the Workingmen's Party ticket; it is unclear whether he agreed with the racist ideas of Workingmen's Party leader Denis Kearney, or merely with the party's anti-capitalist doctrines. He served on the California Senate from 1879 to 1882, and lost his re-election bid as a Greenbacker.  He later ran for Congress in California as a Greenbacker.

Death 
Warren Chase died in Cobden, Illinois, in 1891, and was buried at Cobden Cemetery.

Books

References

|-

|-

1813 births
1891 deaths
19th-century American politicians
American abolitionists
American city founders
American pioneers
American spiritualists
American temperance activists
California Greenbacks
California state senators
Fourierists
People from Fond du Lac County, Wisconsin
People from Pittsfield, New Hampshire
Ripon College (Wisconsin)
Wisconsin Free Soilers
Wisconsin state senators
Workingmen's Party of California people
Writers from California
Writers from New Hampshire
Writers from Wisconsin